Börje Jeppson (7 November 1915 – 20 September 1979) was a Swedish equestrian. He competed in two events at the 1952 Summer Olympics.

References

1915 births
1979 deaths
Swedish male equestrians
Olympic equestrians of Sweden
Equestrians at the 1952 Summer Olympics
Sportspeople from Lund